The 2006 Sultan Azlan Shah Cup was the 15th edition of field hockey tournament the Sultan Azlan Shah Cup.

Participating nations
Eight countries participated in the tournament:

Results
All times are Malaysia Standard Time (UTC+08:00)

Preliminary round

Pool A

Pool B

Classification round

Fifth to eighth place classification

Seventh and eighth place

Fifth and sixth place

First to fourth place classification

Semi-finals

Third and fourth place

Final

Final ranking

References

External links
Official website

2006 in field hockey
2006
2006 in Malaysian sport
2006 in South Korean sport
2006 in Australian field hockey
2006 in New Zealand sport
2006 in Dutch sport
2006 in Pakistani sport 
2006 in Indian sport 
2006 in Argentine sport